John Herbert Babington,  (6 February 1911 – 25 March 1992) was a British teacher and Royal Navy officer who was awarded the George Cross for "great gallantry and undaunted devotion to duty" in defusing bombs during World War II.

George Cross
Following a Luftwaffe air raid on the Royal Navy shore establishment at Chatham Dockyard (HMS Pembroke) Babington defused a bomb which had fallen that was fitted with an anti-withdrawal device.

Citation
Notice of Babington's George Cross appeared in the London Gazette on 27 December 1940.

Later war career
He was later appointed an officer of the Order of the British Empire for gallantry in 1944.

Postwar career
Babington became the Headmaster at the Royal Hospital School and the Ashlyns School, Berkhamsted, the first co-educational bilateral school in Hertfordshire. He was headmaster of Diss Grammar School in Norfolk, England, from 1947 to 1951.

References

Officers of the Order of the British Empire
British recipients of the George Cross
Royal Navy recipients of the George Cross
Royal Naval Volunteer Reserve personnel of World War II
People educated at Wyggeston Grammar School for Boys
Schoolteachers from Suffolk
1992 deaths
Bomb disposal personnel
1911 births
Heads of schools in England
British expatriates in China